New Zealand at the 1938 British Empire Games was represented by a team of 69 competitors and 13 officials, including 18 athletes, 15 rowers, eight swimmers and divers, and seven each of boxers, cyclists and wrestlers. Selection of the team for the Games in Sydney, New South Wales, Australia, was the responsibility of the New Zealand Olympic and British Empire Games Association. New Zealand's flagbearer at the opening ceremony was Jim Leckie.  The New Zealand team finished fifth on the medal table, winning a total of 25 medals, five of which were gold.

New Zealand has competed in every games, starting with the British Empire Games in 1930 at Hamilton, Ontario.

Medal tables

Competitors
The following table lists the number of New Zealand competitors participating at the Games per sport/discipline.

Athletics

Track

Field

Boxing

Cycling

Road
Men's road race

Track
Men's 1000 m sprint

Men's 1 km time trial

Men's 10 miles track race

Diving

Lawn bowls

Rowing

Percival Stowers and Cliff Johnson accompanied the team as emergencies, but did not compete.

Swimming

Wrestling

Officials
 Team manager – H. McCormick
 Deputy team manager – Dolph Kitto
 Athletics coach – B. R. McKernan
 Boxing manager – F. Hughes
 Cycling manager – H. L. Grant
 Lawn bowls
 Manager – A. Whitten
 Assistant manager – E. Petty
 Rowing 
 Manager – Allen Hale
 Coach – Herbert Ayers
 Swimming manager – Edward Clarke Isaacs
 Wrestling
 Manager – J. Creeke
 Coach – A. Craig
 Chaperone – E. G. Sutherland

See also
New Zealand Olympic Committee
New Zealand at the Commonwealth Games
New Zealand at the 1936 Summer Olympics

References

 All team lists and results from NZOC

External links
NZOC website on the 1938 games
Commonwealth Games Federation website
Athletes in the 1966 Encyclopaedia of New Zealand has a paragraph on these Games

1938
British Empire Games
Nations at the 1938 British Empire Games